This is a list of roads designated A30. Road entries are sorted by alphabetical order of country.

 A30 motorway (Canada), a road in Quebec connecting Salaberry-de-Valleyfield and Bécancour
 A30 road (England), a road connecting London and Lands End, Cornwall
 A30 motorway (France), a road connecting A31 near Metz and  N52 near Longwy, France
 A30 motorway (Netherlands), a road connecting the A12 motorway near Ede with the A1 near Barneveld
 A30 road (Isle of Man), a road connecting St. John's and Patrick
 A30 motorway (Spain), a road connecting Albacete with Murcia and the Autopista AP-7, Spain
 A30 road (Sri Lanka), a road connecting Vavuniya and Parayanalankulama
 A 30 motorway (Germany), a road connecting Hannover and the Dutch A1 motorway
 G1501 Shanghai Ring Expressway, an orbital road in Shanghai, China, formerly designated as A30

A030